Pellino is an Italian surname. Notable people with the surname include:

Gioele Pellino (born 1983), Italian motorcycle racer
Giovanni Pellino (born 1967), also known as Neffa, Italian singer-songwriter, rapper, composer, producer and musician

See also
Pelling (surname)

Italian-language surnames